Ballipadu is a village in West Godavari District of Andhra Pradesh, India. It is located in the Thallapudi mandal of Andhra region. It is located 86 km towards east from District headquarters Eluru. Kovvur is the nearest railway station located at a distance of more than 10 KM.

Geography

This Place is in the border of the West Godavari District and East Godavari District. East Godavari District Seethanagaram is North towards this place.

Demographics 

 Census of India, Ballipadu had a population of 1400. The total population constitute, 694 males and 706 females with a sex ratio of 1017 females per 1000 males. 162 children are in the age group of 0–6 years, with sex ratio of 1382. The average literacy rate stands at 70.88%.

References 

Villages in West Godavari district